Robert M. Waymouth (born 1960) is an American chemist. He is the Robert Eckles Swain Professor in Chemistry at Stanford University.

Early life and education
He was born in 1960 in Warner Robins, Georgia. In 1982 he earned a B.S. in chemistry and a B.A. in mathematics from Washington and Lee University. He received a PhD in chemistry from the California Institute of Technology in 1987 and did postdoctoral research at the Institut fur Polymere in Zurich, Switzerland.

Career
He became an assistant professor at Stanford in 1988 and a full professor in 1997. In 2000 he was named the Robert Eckles Swain Professor of Chemistry. He heads the Waymouth Group, which applies mechanistic principles to develop new concepts in catalysis. He has a particular interest in the disposal and recycling of plastics.

References

Stanford University faculty
21st-century American chemists
Living people
1960 births
California Institute of Technology alumni
Washington and Lee University alumni
People from Warner Robins, Georgia